Kenya is a country in East Africa and a founding member of the East African Community (EAC). Its capital and largest city is Nairobi. The capital, Nairobi, is a regional commercial hub. The economy of Kenya is the largest by GDP in East and Central Africa. Agriculture is a major employer; the country traditionally exports tea and coffee and has more recently begun to export fresh flowers to Europe. The service industry is also a major economic driver. Additionally, Kenya is a member of the East African Community trading bloc.

Notable firms 
This list includes notable companies with primary headquarters located in the country. The industry and sector follow the Industry Classification Benchmark taxonomy. Organizations which have ceased operations are included and noted as defunct.

See also 
 Nairobi Securities Exchange
 List of companies and organizations based in Nairobi

References

External links 
 Nairobi Stock Exchange website
 Capital Markets Authority, Kenya - state corporation regulating capital markets in Kenya, including the Nairobi Stock Exchange
 KenInvest - state corporation, investment trade association
 A history and description of the Nairobi Stock Exchange from MBendi

Kenya